Amr ibn Jurmuz was a soldier of caliph Ali, who assassinated Zubayr ibn al-Awwam shortly after the Battle of the Camel, after Zubayr withdrew from the army before the battle began due to a hadith that Caliph Ali ibn Abi Talib had reminded him with regards to what Muhammad had said to Zubayr: “You will rise up in a battle against Ali ibn Abi Talib”.

Assassination of Zubayr
When the head of Zubayr ibn al-Awwam was presented to Ali ibn Abi Talib by Amr ibn Jarmuz, Caliph Ali could not help but to sob and condemn the murder of his cousin crying out, "Prepare to descend to your abode in hell you bedouin. The prophet S.A.W told me the person who kills az-Zubayr will reside in hell." This reaction caused Amr ibn Jarmuz resentment and, drawing his sword, stabbed it into his own chest.

References

656 deaths
7th-century Arabs
7th-century criminals
Assassins of the medieval Islamic world
Suicides by sharp instrument
Suicides in the medieval Islamic world